Walter Stone may refer to:

 Walter Napleton Stone (1891–1917), English recipient of the Victoria Cross
 Walter F. Stone (1822–1874), Republican politician and judge in Ohio
 Walter W. Stone (1910–1981), Australian book publisher and book collector
 Walter Stone (screenwriter) (born 1920), chief writer for the Honeymooners